White violet may refer to:

 Violets with white flowers, including:
 Viola alba
 Viola blanda
 Viola renifolia
 Viola canadensis
White Violet (band)
 White Violet Center for Eco-Justice